The Royal Military College(s) of Canada, abbreviated in English as RMC and in French as CMR, is a military academy and, since 1959, a degree-granting university of the Canadian Armed Forces. It was established in 1874 and conducted its first classes on June 1, 1876. Presently, it is the only federal institution in Canada with degree-granting powers; the Government of Ontario empowered RMC to confer degrees in the arts, science, and engineering through The Royal Military College of Canada Degrees Act, 1959. Programs are offered at the undergraduate and graduate levels, both on campus as well as through the college's distance learning programme via the Division of Continuing Studies.

Located on Point Frederick, a  peninsula in Kingston, Ontario, the college is a mix of historic buildings and more modern academic, athletic, and dormitory facilities. RMC officer cadets are trained in what are known as the "four pillars": academics, officership, athletics, and bilingualism.

Mission statement

The Royal Military College of Canada prepares officer cadets for a long career in the profession of arms and continues the development of other Canadian Armed Forces members and civilians with an interest in defence issues. RMC provides programs and courses of higher education and professional development to meet the needs of the Canadian Armed Forces and the Department of National Defence.

Responsibilities
RMC is responsible to:
Provide a university education in both official languages in appropriate disciplines designed on a broad base to meet the unique needs of the Canadian Armed Forces
Develop qualities of leadership in officer cadets
Develop the ability to communicate in both official languages for officer cadets
Develop a high standard of physical fitness
Stimulate an awareness of the ethic of the military profession
Conduct research activities in support of RMC and to meet the needs of Defence Research Agencies

Priorities
The RMC priorities are:
To build high quality, world-class programs in areas of importance to the Canadian Armed Forces and to Canada
To promote national and international collaborations and partnerships
To promote interdisciplinary co-operation.

Academics

The RMC mission is to educate, train and develop Officer Cadets for leadership careers of effective service in the Canadian Armed Forces – the Royal Canadian Air Force, the Royal Canadian Navy and the Canadian Army.

For most students under the ROTP (Regular Officer Training Plan), education is free and a monthly salary is paid which meets incidentals. The courses are offered both on site and by distance learning in both official languages: English and French. After graduation, Officers are to serve two months of obligatory service for each subsidized month of education.

RMC offers 19 undergraduate programs in Arts, Science and Engineering.
RMC offers 34 graduate studies opportunities, including 14 doctorates. In addition to the Faculty of Arts, Engineering, and Science, the Division of Continuing Studies offers undergraduate and graduate level programs including the "Officer Professional Military Education" program (OPME). The Department of Applied Military Science (AMS) offers a graduate level program – the Land Force Technical Staff Programme (LFTSP) and an undergraduate/community college level program – the Army Technical Warrant Officer's Programme.

All undergraduate students are required to complete the core curriculum, which is designed to provide a balanced liberal arts, science, and military education. The Core Curriculum consists of Economics, Psychology, Mathematics, English, Calculus, Military history of Canada, Chemistry, Canadian History, Physics and Civics.

Tuition
Tuition fees (2022–23) at the undergraduate level vary from $3,020 – $4,140 per term for Canadian undergraduate students and $2,670 – $2,980 per term for Canadian Graduate students. The tuition fees for international students vary from $7,410 – $7,690 per term for graduate students. The lower tuition amounts are for the arts and sciences programs, while the higher amounts are for the engineering programs.

Because of commitments of military service following graduation, education is free for most on-campus undergraduates; these Officer Cadets also receive an additional monthly salary. Funding has been put in place to support civilian students, who are eligible for admission to the master's and doctoral programs to work alongside graduate students who are members of the Canadian Armed Forces.

Centres and institutes
The research at RMCC focusses on areas of direct and indirect benefit to the Department of National Defence; More than 90 percent of the research at RMC is defence-related. RMC conducts both academic and contracted research on electrical and computer engineering, physics, chemistry, chemical engineering and environmental engineering, civil engineering, mechanical engineering, international security, governance and the economics of defence; some research involves the Institute for the Environment as well as nuclear research. Both members of the Canadian Forces and civilian students are eligible for admission to the master's and doctoral programs; Funding has been put in place to support both military and civilian students.

Squadrons of the Cadet Wing

The undergraduate student body, known as the Cadet Wing, is sub-divided into 13 (12 ROTP and 1 UTPNCM) squadrons of approximately 80 cadets each. Each squadron is subdivided into four flights, with each flight further subdivided into three sections. The squadrons are led by senior cadets under the guidance of the squadron commander.

Note: The dates given are for the current organization of the wing and does not include former squadrons or the same squadrons under different names. For example, 1 Squadron was the first squadron at RMC, meaning 1 squadron has existed since the college's founding in 1876, but has only been known as Hudson Squadron since 1948.

In 2007, a former squadron of the Royal Military College Saint-Jean, Jolliet Squadron, was stood up at RMC as 13 Squadron. The squadron was named in honour of Louis Jolliet, with its first-year flight, Good Flight, named after Herman James Good, a Victoria Cross recipient from the 13th Battalion, CEF.

Training plans
There are several full-time admission options for an education at RMCC.

ROTP
The Regular Officer Training Plan (ROTP) is a conditional scholarship offered to selected applicants. In addition to a university education, Officer Cadets receive military training, occupation training and second language training and a career after graduation. The full-time salary includes full dental care, as well as vacation with full pay. Upon successful completion of ROTP, Officer Cadets are awarded a university degree and granted commissions as Officers in the Canadian Forces. Normally, graduates serve at least five years with the Canadian Forces. The application deadline to ROTP is in January for Basic Officer Training in July and admission the following September.

Typically, successful applicants enter the Canadian Military College (CMC) System as an Officer Cadet, where they receive an education that balances academics, leadership, bilingualism and athletics. If the choice of program is not offered, such as Nursing, Physiotherapy and Pharmacy, or the candidate wishes to attend another university, successful applicants would be eligible to apply to any Canadian university where books, lab fees and student fees are covered, and students receive a monthly salary under the Civilian University ROTP.

RETP
The Reserve Entry Training Plan is an education that is the same as the ROTP but is paid for by the student (not a scholarship). The students also do not draw a salary, however they are not obligated to five years of service after completion. Reserve Entry cadets are, however, paid considerably more than the regular ROTP Officer Cadet salary during their summer training months. They are also entitled to this pay if they attend "Duty/Varsity" away trips (For example, an away game of women's soccer). RETP has been discontinued as of 2017.

Others
UTPNCM: University Training Plan – Non Commissioned Members for Non Commissioned members of the Canadian Forces to earn a degree and then serve as officers.
IBDP: Initial Baccalaureate Degree Program, a Baccalaureate program.
DCS: Division of Continuing Studies, also available part-time

Selection process
Since an application to ROTP is also an application to the Canadian Military College System, all candidates are assessed against an aptitude test, a medical examination, and an interview.

Military Potential is an assessment of Aptitudes, Personality Traits, and the choice of occupation. Academic Performance is rated based on a student's transcript. Unlike many universities, since a complete transcript is submitted to the selection board, grade 9-11 marks are heavily weighted in a student's application with consideration given to grade 12 (or the final year's) marks. Officer Cadets are obliged to maintain satisfactory academic and military performance throughout the programme.

Continuing studies
RMC started a graduate studies program in 1965. The Division of Continuing Studies was established in 1997.

The mandate of the RMC Division of Continuing Studies is to make university education available to all members of the Canadian Forces, spouses and DND civilian employees. Canadian Forces and other professional training is recognized for credit towards undergraduate or advanced degrees.

Unique degree programs, specially tailored for CF members, include:
Bachelor of Military Arts & Sciences,
Master of Business Administration,
Master of Defence Management and Policy, and
Master of Arts and PhD in War Studies.

Artist-in-Residence
The Royal Military College of Canada launched its Artist-in-Residence program in January 2010 with Steven Heighton, a novelist and poet as the first to hold the post. The third person to hold the position, playwright Dr. Julie Salverson, presented "Drama, Imagination, and RMC" on 3 April 2012 in Currie Hall. Dr. Salverson, who has conducted drama workshops with cadets since the early 1990s, helped facilitate a play about RMC, "Shakespeare in Scarlets" in 2012. In 2014, the Artist-in-Residence was Gord Sinclair of The Tragically Hip, who put together a concert on the parade square where cadets, staff, and faculty performed for their peers at an event dubbed Bruciepalooza. Both The Trews and guitarist Rob Baker of The Tragically Hip made unexpected guest appearances to perform for the college. Kingston photographer Chris Miner held the position throughout the 2014–15 academic year, culminating in a gallery exhibition of his work along with winning photographs by students, staff, and faculty submitted as part of the Photo Op 2015 photography contest. In the winter term of the 2015–2016 academic year, Canadian novelist and poet Helen Humphreys was the Artist-in-Residence, and held weekly workshops on novel writing and poetry.

Research and partnerships
In the Engineering and Science divisions, RMC pursues the following principal areas of research:
information technology, communications, microelectronics,
environment,
energy and energy development,
Advanced materials engineering,
geotechnical engineering, and
fluid mechanics and engineering.

In the Social Sciences and Humanities divisions, RMC pursues research and activities in:
military history,
political science and international security,
peacekeeping and peacemaking,
comparative government, international relations and ethical code of conduct in conflict,
leadership, and
economics.
The RMC Centre for Security, Armed Forces and Society (CSAS-CESFAS) provides a focus for research conducted within the Faculty of Arts and facilitates communication between the Department of National Defence, other research institutions, scholars and Canadian civil society.

In the Department of Applied Military Science (AMS), RMC pursues:
the Land Force Technical Staff Programme (captains & majors);
the Technical Warrant Officer Programme (warrant officers & master warrant officers).

The Diploma in Military Arts and Sciences (DMASc) provides non-commissioned members (NCMs) of the Canadian Forces an online program made possible by a partnership between OntarioLearn, the RMC, and the Canadian Defence Academy. Under RMC and community college articulation agreements, all graduates of this diploma program who apply to the RMC will be admitted into the Bachelor of Military Arts and Sciences degree program with advanced standing.

Military training
As an RMC cadet, military training begins with Basic Military Officer Qualification (BMOQ) in the summer prior to first year and prior to second year at the Canadian Forces Leadership and Recruit School Saint-Jean. After the completion of BMOQ, those cadets who are not yet bilingual are usually enrolled in a seven-week period of Second Language Training (SLT) at Canadian Forces Language School Detachment Saint-Jean, or may remain in Kingston to study a second official language. The remaining summers are spent doing various other training depending on the specific elements or occupations of each cadet.

First Year Orientation Period 
First Year Orientation Period, (FYOP) is the most demanding challenge many cadets will face during their time at the college. FYOP takes place during the first month of the academic year following the completion of the first mod of BMOQ. Prior to the 2015–16 academic year, cadets would attend 2 week program called recruit camp in which cadets would undergo some basic military training before entering the college. With newly hired cadets completing half of their BMOQ before attending RMC, recruit camp is no longer necessary. FYOP is like Frosh week at civilian universities, except it lasts three weeks and cadets are placed under extreme stress for nearly the entire duration. FYOP begins with the Arch parade where the entire First Year class is marched onto College grounds by their FYOP staff consisting of Third and Fourth Years.

During the course of FYOP, First Year cadets are required to keep an exceptionally high standard of dress and deportment. They are required to march at all times. Physical Training is conducted, with long runs up neighbouring Fort Henry, Ontario hill a frequent occurrence. Inspections of room standards and dress are conducted daily. For the duration of FYOP, First Years are not permitted to leave RMC or receive visitors. Mail and phone calls are allowed but are limited.

The culmination of the FYOP is the obstacle course. The obstacle course lasts over 2 hours and consists of twelve obstacles built by each squadron located around the college grounds. Obstacles such as a 12-foot wall and rope bridge are designed to test teamwork and physical fitness of First Years. The First Year flights are judged on the time it takes to complete each obstacle. The completion of the obstacle course signals the end of FYOP. Afterwards, First Years are given a parade where they are officially welcomed into RMC and join the Cadet Wing. Cadets are then allowed to see their friends and relatives, and are allowed the freedom to leave college grounds. In previous years, cadets were required to wear their College uniform when leaving the college grounds, but as of 2017 this rule has been modified; cadets can now wear civilian business casual clothes. When attending formal events, the college uniform worn is the number 4s. This form of dress consists of dark blue pants with a red stripe down the side and a dark blue tunic. Badges can be put on both arms once earned. The year is also represented on the lower arms by red ribbon; however, second year is the first to have any red ribbon.

Second year cadets, in RMC's academic mentorship program, are paired with first year cadets as "academic parents" to mentor, guide, and influence them during their study at the college. This program, however, relies entirely on the second year cadet's following through on their due diligence to mentor their "academic children", as there is almost no staff (commissioned officer / non-commissioned member) oversight over the ongoings of either the FYOP or academic mentorship program, outside of general rule-making.

Many of the aspects of the FYOP, including the obstacle course and mentorship program, were developed by the post-war Chesley committee, led by Brigadier Leonard McEwan Chelsey, O.B.E., E.D. The committee made recommendations about the education and training of officer candidates for the postwar active force. In addition, the committee made recommendations about the provision of French-speaking officers and arrangements for promotion from the ranks.

Law 
The Military Law Centre on the grounds of RMC, staffed with 12 military lawyers, oversees the education of officers and troops in legal matters ranging from the Forces' own code of conduct to the laws of war. It trains military lawyers and advises Ottawa on matters of policy and doctrine. The centre integrates legal education into the regular training that Forces members undergo and establishes its growing importance within the military hierarchy.
Selected RMC Canada cadets participate in Law of Armed Conflict international Competitions each fall with cadets from USAFA, USMA, USNA, and USCGA. Each year, RMC cadets are selected to participate in a competition on the Law of Armed Conflict at the International Institute of Humanitarian Law in Sanremo, Italy.

Athletics

One of the four components of the Royal Military College of Canada, the Athletic component provides opportunities for officer cadets to participate in physical activities and sports that are mentally demanding to develop their physical capabilities, confidence and leadership. Physical education is meant "to establish a strong foundation of skills and knowledge in physical fitness, sports, and military-related activities through a progressive and diverse physical education program for RMC Officer Cadets" The Vision is "foster a passion for active living and leadership in physical activity." To enhance their physical fitness and develop military and athletic skills necessary to lead their troops, Cadets must take physical education classes and play intramural sports every year – for a minimum of four hours per week.

Royal Military College of Canada Bands

The Massed Band, consisting of the Brass and Reed, Pipes and Drums, and Highland Dancers, perform at parades, public relation trips and recruit shows. The Brass and Reed Band is a multi-purpose section, used primarily as a parade march and concert band. The Pipe Section and the Drum Section perform at mess dinners; parades; sporting events; ceremonies (official or squadron); weddings; funerals; public relations; wing events; Christmas Ball (RMC) & Graduation Balls; private events; and holidays. The Highland Dance Section perform at many of the same functions with the exception of parades and funerals. The Choir performs the Canadian national anthem; sings at mess dinners; and accompanies the Stage Band on selected pieces including: folk, jazz, traditional music, French music, show tunes, African music and Christmas songs. The Stage Band is versatile, performing dinner music followed by marches at college mess dinners. The Cheer Band, a subsidiary of the Brass and Reed, performs music for RMC sporting events, such as the Carr-Harris Cup and the Westpoint Weekend.

Campus

RMC is located on Point Frederick (Kingston, Ontario), a small peninsula at the point where the St. Lawrence River leaves Lake Ontario and where the Rideau Canal system starts.
The location has been an active military base since 1789 and the Kingston Royal Naval Dockyard, located on the site, was an important dockyard during the War of 1812.

Point Frederick includes two sites with National Historic Site of Canada designations: the Royal Navy Dockyard and the Point Frederick Buildings

RMC, the first officer training college in Canada, opened in 1876 with 18 cadets receiving both military and academic instruction. It was granted university status in 1959.
The Stone Frigate, a large stone building completed in 1820 by Sir Robert Barrie, was designed to hold gear and rigging from British warships dismantled in compliance with the Rush–Bagot Treaty. It served as a barracks briefly in 1837–38, and was refitted as a dormitory and classrooms to house RMC by 1876.

During the Great Depression in Canada of the 1930s, an unemployment relief camp on Barriefield lower common was set up under the command of the RMC Commandant. Public works projects relied on the labour of the 'Royal Twenty Centres' supplied by the under the Unemployment Relief Commission. The public works projects included rebuilding the dry stone wall and moat of Fort Frederick; the physics building extension, the connection from the Fort Frederick dormitory to the new Yeo mess building, the new wing of the hospital, a new garage, road work, levelling the grounds at RMC for new football fields and a new running track. The cornerstone of Yeo Hall was laid in 1934 by the Earl of Bessborough, HE The Gov Gen. Yeo Hall was opened in 1936.

The Officers' Mess was moved in 1960 to the Senior Staff Mess at which point 'Bill & Alfie's' became a recreational space for Senior Cadets. There were renovations to Fort LaSalle dormitory and Yeo Hall between 1993–1995 to accommodate the closure of the other two colleges. In 1997, there were additions to the Dining Room, and an extension for the kitchen and servery above which is the Cadet Mess at Yeo Hall.

Honorary degrees
The nominations for honorary degrees by the Royal Military Colleges can be initiated by different organizations or individuals, including the Royal Military Colleges Club of Canada through any member of the college senate. As with most of Canadian universities, the senate, which in the case of RMC is composed of the Chancellor (Minister of National Defence), the Vice Chancellor (The RMCC Commandant), Principal, Deans, DCadet, Registrar and the Directeur des Etudes du Royal Military College Saint-Jean, makes the final decision. The Royal Military Colleges Club of Canada (RMCCC) has no responsibility or authority in the process of granting honorary degrees.

Uniforms

Cadets wear a variety of uniforms depending on the occasion and their environment: ceremonial dress (semi ceremonial); full dress (formal occasions); outside sports dress; service dress Air Force; service dress Navy; service dress Navy without jacket; Service dress Air Force without jacket; service dress Army without jacket; and combat dress. In winter 2009, Royal Military College officer cadets returned to wearing a distinctive Dress of the Day (DOD) uniform which consists of a white shirt, black sweater/light jacket, as well as black trousers/skirt with a red stripe down the side. The headdress is a black wedge with red piping. Mess dress is worn in the Senior Staff Mess for formal occasions such as mess dinners.

Student life

The RMC Cadet Mess in Yeo Hall has facilities for social and recreational activities. Staff and faculty have access to the Senior Staff Mess.
Both Royal Military College of Canada chapels serving Roman Catholic, Protestant and Muslim communities are located in Yeo Hall.
The Baronial Hall or Currie Hall, which was designed in 1922 by Percy Erskine Nobbs to honour the Canadian Expeditionary Force in World War I play a prominent role in the life of the university. During special events, invited speakers and dignitaries may address the university population or the general public from the Great Hall. Many conferences held in Kingston, Ontario may book the halls for lectures or presentations.
The CANEX is a small retail store in Yeo Hall for personal articles, souvenirs, snacks and dry cleaning.
Bill & Alphie's, the on-campus cadet mess in Yeo Hall, is named after Bruce Bairnsfather's Great War cartoon characters. Old Bill & little Alphie, stone carvings based on two World War I cartoon characters by Bruce Bairnsfather, appear at the entrance to RMC's Yeo Hall.
The campus is on the shore of Lake Ontario and has easy access to two lake-front parks, favourite locations for students to relax. The campus is also located approximately 10 minutes' walk from the city's downtown.
Cadets are obligated to perform community service. Every year there is a mandatory class project. The first year class project has cadets conduct an event for the "underprivileged" youth of the city. The second year class project has cadets conduct a food drive for the city's food bank. The third year class project has cadets perform upkeep on the city's many parks. The fourth year class project has the class project leader raise money for a charity through the conduct of a fundraiser which usually takes the form of a baseball tournament.
The student clubs and organizations associated with the RMC include: Arts, Astronomy, Broomball, Cheerleading, Chess, Climbing, Cycling, Debating, drama, Duke of Edinburgh's Award, Expedition, Fish & Game, Flying, golf, Judo, Juggling, Taekwondo, Outdoors, Paintball, Photo, rowing, Social Dance, Stage Band, Triathlon/Running, Video Editing, War Games, Water Polo, Windsurfing, Women's Rugby and Yachting. In recent years, an Automotive Club has been added.
 The RMC Drama Club performed a tongue-in-cheek look at the college fraternization policy "Shakespeare in Scarlets," at Currie Hall in March 2012 with cadets serving as actors, writers, director, and tech crew.

Alumni giving

The Royal Military Colleges of Canada Foundation is a registered Canadian charity which was incorporated in 1966. As an element of the Canadian Forces, the college is unable to fund a conventional full-time fundraising team in a development office. The foundation, consequently, works at arm's length to assist the college financially. Capital Campaigns have included the 2364 Leonard Birchall Pavilion (2007); Memorial Arch Restoration (2001) and the New Library Campaign (2013).

Media
RMC cadets once produced the campus newspaper, the Precision, however this does not exist anymore. The alumni association produces Veritas and e-Veritas.
Currently, a campus newspaper called "The Slasher Standard" circulates around RMC producing satirical material.

Summer programs
The facilities are used during the summer for:
HMCS Ontario, a Royal Canadian Sea Cadets Summer Training Centre
"Can you dig it?" a week-long archaeology summer camp.
Conferences and sporting events
Summer athletic and fencing camps at RMC include: RMC Soccer Camp "Kingston Kicks"; RMC Fencing High Performance Training Camp; RMC Super Summer Sports Camp; RMC Pirate Camp; RMC Volleyball Camp.

Features and buildings

The property includes elements of several National Historic Sites of Canada Point Frederick Buildings NHSC, Kingston Royal Naval Dockyard NHSC, the Fort Frederick (Kingston, Ontario) component of Kingston Fortifications NHSC; Rideau Canal; and part of a UNESCO World Heritage Site.
The Register of the Government of Canada Heritage Buildings lists five Classified Federal Heritage Buildings and twenty-three Recognized Federal Heritage Buildings on the Royal Military College of Canada grounds:

The Chief Dominion Architect(s) designed a number of public buildings at the college: Thomas Seaton Scott (1872–1881); Thomas Fuller (architect) (1881–1896); David Ewart (1896–1914); Edgar Lewis Horwood (1914–1917); Richard Cotsman Wright (1918–1927); Thomas W. Fuller (1927–1936), Charles D. Sutherland (1936–1947) and Joseph Charles Gustave Brault (1947–1952). Thomas Seaton Scott and Thomas Fuller adopted the Neo-Gothic style. David Ewart embraced the Baronial style. Richard Cotsman Wright (1918–1927) adopted the Collegiate Gothic style.

Other campus buildings

Libraries
The Royal Military College of Canada Libraries is a member of the Ontario Council of University Libraries and is a contributor to Open Content Alliance.

The Massey Library collection consists of approximately 250,000 books, 1,800 audio-visual items and 1,200 periodicals in English and French. The library possesses RMC historical material including cadet photographs, scrapbooks, collections, diaries, and letters. The major collections follow:

Dormitories
RMC has six dormitories, which are similar to most universities and provide the basic necessities. Organized by squadron, dormitories are co-educational with separate washrooms for men and women. Officer Cadets share a room in first year, and sometimes in succeeding years depending on availability of space, if possible with someone who is proficient in the other official language.

The oldest, the Stone Frigate was built in 1819–20 and is a Canadian Heritage Site. The Stone Frigate, known within the college as "The Boat" houses 1 Squadron who in turn call themselves the Stone Frigate Military Academy. The next building built Fort Lasalle holds 7, 8, and 9 squadron while the third building, Fort Haldimand hosts 11 and 12 Squadron. Fort Champlain (1965) accommodates the Cadet Wing Headquarters and 2 and 3 Squadron.  Fort Sauve (2001) houses 4, 5, and 6 Squadron and the newest dormitory, Fort Brant (2011) aka "The Greenhouse" houses ALOY and 10 squadron. Fort Brant was called such due to the overheating problems experienced by the massive glass facade which by facing south traps a large amount of solar heat which is then circulated throughout the building.

Memorials and traditions

 e.g. Triumphal arch; Trophies, Commemorative and Memorial Trees, Monuments, Plaques, and Others. This includes a list of RMC Traditions and RMC Militaria & Collectibles
In honour of Remembrance Day, 2012 students in Dr Erika Behrisch Elce's first-year English for science and engineering students wrote a sonnet on behalf of one of those connected with Royal Military College of Canada who died doing his or her duty. A printed collection will also soon be available through the College Library for general distribution.

The RMC's official cheer is the following:

 Call: Gimme a beer!
 Response: Beer! Esses! Emma! T-D-V!Who can stop old RMC!Shrapnel, Cordite, NCT!R-M-C Hooah!

Environmental assessments
Having three national historical designations, environmental assessments (which also involve archaeological studies) are required before construction activities are implemented on the college grounds. While planning to build a new dormitory at RMC, a required environmental assessment revealed the remains of a naval dockyard. This dockyard was significant in the building of ships by the British during the War of 1812. Because of the site's significance, a full archaeological dig had to be implemented before construction of the new dormitory could begin.

History
Long before the Royal Military College was established in 1876, there were proposals for military colleges in Canada. Although the Assembly of Lower Canada decided to establish a military college in 1815, agreement upon its organization was blocked by religious and linguistic conflicts.

Military college at Three Rivers (1816)
Captain A.G. Douglas, a former adjutant at the British military college at Great Marlow, recommended in 1816 the establishment of a military college open to Catholic and Protestant boys at Three Rivers in a disused government house with himself as superintendent. Douglas' college was intended as a boarding school to educate the young sons of officers, among others, in Latin, English language, French Language, History, Geography, Drawing and Mathematics.

Military College in March Township (1826)
In 1826, retired British navy and army officers who had settled in March township, near Ottawa, Ontario proposed a military college boarding school for boys on the Great Lakes on naval and military lines.

School of Military Instruction in Toronto, Quebec, (1864) Kingston, London and Hamilton (1865)
Staffed by British Regulars, the adult male students underwent a 3-month-long military course in Toronto, Ontario and Quebec, Quebec in 1864, and at Montreal, Quebec Kingston, Ontario London, Ontario and Hamilton, Ontario in 1865. The School of Military Instruction in Kingston was established by Militia General Order of 10 February 1865 for the purpose of enabling Officers of Militia or Candidates for Commission or promotion in the Militia to perfect themselves in a knowledge of their Military duties, drill and discipline. The Commandant certified that a cadet from a particular Regimental Division attended said School of Military Instruction and had proven himself to his satisfaction able to command a Company at Battalion Drill, to Drill a Company at Company Drill and that he has acquired a complete acquaintance with the internal economy of a Company and the duties of a Company's Officer and that he is qualified under the provisions of the said General Order to hold either a First or Second Class Certificate. Although the military colleges in London and Hamilton had disbanded in 1865, the schools at Quebec, Montreal, Kingston and Toronto were retained at Confederation, in 1867. In 1868, schools of Cavalry and Artillery were formed in Toronto and a school of artillery was formed in Montreal. Since these were not Boarding schools, students lived in the communities.

Military School in Halifax and Saint John
At a pre-Confederation of Canada military school in Halifax, Nova Scotia, adult male students drilled and attended lectures on drill commands, military records, court-martial, the Articles of War, discipline and punishments, promotion of non commissioned officers, military accounts and pay and messing. After Confederation, military schools were opened in Halifax and Saint John.

Cavalry, infantry and artillery schools at Halifax, Saint John, Quebec, Montreal, Kingston and Toronto (1870–71)
In 1870–71, Canadian militia staff replaced the British regulars who were recalled from overseas station. From December to May, six schools conducted officer training for cavalry, infantry and artillery. The British Garrisons operated the schools at Halifax, Saint John, New Brunswick and Quebec. Canadian militia staff and former British army drill sergeants operated the schools at Montreal, Kingston and Toronto.

The first full-time units of the Canadian militia, A and B Batteries at Kingston and Quebec, organized gunnery schools on a year-round basis in which artillery courses lasted from 3–12 months with the possibility of extension. Colonel P Robertson-Ross, adjutant general of the militia (1870–3) recommended the schools be organized as tactical brigades of three arms and that infantry and cavalry schools should also be put on a permanent basis. The Canadian government did not accept his advice.

Royal Military College of Canada (1876)
A plaque located at the college describes the college's history: "Following the withdrawal of British forces from Canada in 1870–71, the federal government recognized the need for an officer training college in Canada. In 1874, during the administration of the Hon. Alexander Mackenzie, enabling legislation was passed. Located on Point Frederick, the site of the former Royal Naval Dockyard, the new college opened on June 1, 1876, with 18 cadets under Lt.-Col. Edward O. Hewett, R.E. Named the Royal Military College of Canada in 1878, it offered academic and military training courses designed to prepare cadets for both military and civil careers. The college was reorganized in 1948 as a tri-service institution and, in 1959, it became the first military college in the British Commonwealth to achieve degree-granting status."

The Royal Military College of Canada "was the first military college to be established in a colonial dependency and it had a double function, the preparation of cadets for civilian careers as well as for military commissions." Richard A Preston, Canada's RMC. The Kingston Royal Naval Dockyard was a Royal Navy yard from 1788 to 1853 at the site of the current Royal Military College of Canada.

The first college Commandant, Lieut. Colonel Hewett, made the first public announcement of the college motto and ‘device’ (badge) during a prize presentation held at the Kingston Military College on 11 February 1878. "I now have to tell you Gentlemen Cadets, that a device and motto has been selected for the Military College. The device, a mailed arm bearing a maple leaf; symbolical of the position you, as the future officers of Canada, should hold towards your country as represented by the maple leaf. The motto, "Truth, Duty, and Valour,"- three simple words in plain English -that all who run may read."

These words by Professor Robert Carr Harris, RMC's first Professor of Engineering, were recalled when his son No. 1118 Major G. G. M. Carr-Harris unveiled a plaque in the entrance to the Currie Building in 1964 to the memory of his father "Engineering, leads a man among actions, thoughts, and associations which are useful and honourable, and a life so spent will leave its mark upon anyone's character." The Harris memorial plaque is alongside one commemorating the first Commandant Major Edward Osborne Hewett who chose the college motto, "Truth, Duty, Valour". The Hewett plaque is alongside one commemorating the first Staff Adjutant Major Raymond N.R. Reade, a British officer sent to the RMC from London in 1901, who authorized construction of a gymnasium, a hospital, an electrical plant, and a permanent accommodation for the staff-adjutant and his family.

In fiction and popular culture

The Royal Military College's central place in Canadian military circles has made it the setting for novels, plays, films and other cultural works:
In Jetstream, a 2007 television series airing on Discovery Canada about pilots training to fly the CF-18 Hornet in the Canadian Forces, seven of the eight pilots are graduates of the RMC.
Timothy Findley's fictional character Robert Ross in his World War I novel ‘the Wars’ (Penguin Canada 2005) studied military law and trajectory mathematics at the Royal Military College of Canada. His novel won the Governor General's Award for fiction and was adapted into a play. In 1985, Timothy Findley was appointed an Officer of the Order of Canada.
1982 John-James Ford's protagonist in his coming-of-age novel Bonk on the Head studied at the Royal Military College of Canada. The novel won the 2006 Ottawa Book Award in the English fiction category.
Oscar Telgmann and George Cameron's "Leo the Royal Cadet" is an opera written in 1889 in which Leo leaves his sweetheart Nellie to serve in the Anglo-Zulu War. Songs about cadet life include 'The Bulldogs', and 'The Royal Cadet'
"Till we meet again", is a musical set in Montreal, Quebec during World War II. Each act features an interview with an ex Royal Military College of Canada cadet who is a Canadian army officer: after Dunkirk, after Dieppe and after Juno Beach.
Sara Jeanette Duncan's "Cousin Cinderella: A Canadian Girl in London" by Macmillan in New York and Methuen in London (1908) features Graham, a Royal Military College of Canada graduate, and his sister Mary Trent. Graham and Mary's father, Senator Trent has earned a fortune in the family lumber business. After serving in South Africa and entering the family lumber business Graham Trent travels with his sister Mary from Minnebiac, a fictional small town in Ontario to England. There, Graham Trent becomes engaged to Barbara Pavisay, a member of a proud old English family whose line extends back to the Tudors. When Barbara Pavisay breaks off the engagement to Graham, his sister Mary becomes engaged to Barbara's brother Lord Pavisay. It is assumed that Graham Trent will return to Canada, continue in the family business and be elected to Parliament. Sara Jeanette Duncan's "A Voyage of Consolation" is a sequel to "Cousin Cinderella: A Canadian Girl in London."
Dr. David Clark's Canadian Army Trilogy, The Ridge (1994), Lamone (2001) and Lucifer's Gate 2002 outlines the stories of two generations of the Warwick family and the Canadian Army in World War I. In Lucifer's Gate, Captain James Niles, a Royal Military College graduate, is posted temporarily to a recruit training battalion. He is a professional officer, all spit and polish, everything by the King's Regulations. After ordering the crowd to disperse, Niles accepts thanks from German proprietors of a tailor shop, Hans and Analise Holzhauer and falls for their daughter, Rosamund. The lovely Rosamund is unfortunately, an unsuitable match since they are worlds apart in social position. Niles, who is practically engaged to the Colonel's daughter Roselyn, comes to realize while serving under General Arthur Currie in France, that Roselyn never has a serious thought, caring only about tennis and garden parties.

Notable faculty, alumni, and senior officers

See also

 Royal Military College of Canada Museum
 Royal Military College Saint-Jean
 Royal Roads Military College
 Royal Naval College of Canada
 Canadian Interuniversity Sport
 Canadian government scientific research organizations
 Canadian university scientific research organizations
 Canadian industrial research and development organizations
 The Canadian Crown and the Canadian Forces
 Defence Research and Development Canada
 Khaki University
 List of Ontario Universities
 Canadian Military Colleges
 Canadian Coast Guard College

Other countries:
Royal Military Academy Sandhurst – the British Army equivalent
Australian Defence Force Academy - the Australian Defence Force equivalent
United States Military Academy West Point
Britannia Royal Naval College (after the closure of Royal Naval College, Greenwich this remains the only operational Naval college in the UK) – the Royal Navy equivalent
Royal Air Force College Cranwell – the Royal Air Force equivalent
Officer Training Unit, Scheyville
Indonesian Army Command and General Staff College

References

Citations

Sources 

 Articles
 
Royal Military College Museum 
War Museum: Royal Military College of Canada
Schoolfinder Royal Military College
Truth, Duty, Valour: Canada Connects
A Brief History of the Royal Military College Club
Historical Sketch of the Royal Military College of Canada 
 5992 Doctor A.J. Barrett Uneasy Partners, Hopeful Future-The Royal Military College of Canada and the Canadian Defence Academy
 W.A. Boutin, "Arts versus engineering: the Royal Military College dilemma" Toronto: Canadian Forces College, 1997 Call 355.005 C3.
 H24263 Dr. John Scott Cowan RMC and the Profession of Arms: Looking Ahead at Canada's Military Universary
 Phyllis P Browne The Socialization of Cadets at the Royal Military College of Canada: A Conceptual Overview (2004)
 G1397 Major Andrew Godefroy CD, PhD, plsc Professional Training put to the test: the Royal Military College of Canada and Army Leadership in the South African War 1899–1902 The Army Doctrine and Training Bulletin Vol.6 No.2 (Summer 2003).
 Heather Grace Across the bridge and over the wall: Queen's and the Royal Military College
 Adrian Preston "The Founding of the Royal Military College: Gleanings from the Royal Archives." Queen's Quarterly 74, no. 3 (Autumn 1967).
Adrian Preston "The Founding of the Royal Military College" Ottawa: Canadian Forces. No 155.
 Richard A. Preston et al. Royal Military College of Canada, profile in The Canadian Encyclopedia
 Cameron Pulsifer "The Royal Military College of Canada: 1876 to the Present" Dispatches: Backgrounders in Canadian Military History
 Cameron Pulsifer Royal Military College of Canada: 1876 to Present
Military Knowledge and Scientific Pursuits Royal Military College of Canada
 Mayor George N. Speal The Freedom of the City of Kingston for the Royal Military College of Canada Publication of the Kingston Historical Society. Vol. 25. 1977.

 Books
 Walter S. Avis: "Essays and articles selected from a quarter century of scholarship at the Royal Military College of Canada, Kingston" (Occasional papers of the Department of English, R.M.C.) 1978.
 2141 Thomas Leigh Brock (RMC 1930) "Fight the good fight: Looking in on the recruit class at the Royal Military College of Canada during a week in February 1931" (private printing), Victoria, 1964.
 2141 Thomas Leigh Brock (RMC 1930) "The R.M.C. Vintage Class of 1934" (private printing, Victoria, 1983)
 Peter J.S. Dunnett "Royal Roads Military College 1940–1990, A Pictorial Retrospective" (Royal Roads Military College, Victoria, BC 1990)
 8662 Dr. Allan D. English (RMC 1971), Ed "The Changing Face of War" written by military professionals engaged in war studies at Royal Military College of Canada McGill Queens Univ Press
 19828 John-James Ford, (RMC 1995) wrote Bonk on the head, a novel that describes a fictional officer-cadet's life at RMC
 6647 Major (Ret) Mitchell Kryzanowski (RMC 1965), wrote Currie Hall: Memorial to the Canadian Corps (Kingston: Hewson and White, 1989), a description of the decoration of Currie Hall
 S125 Major (Ret) William WJ Oliver, and S134 Mrs Rolande Oliver, "RMC Hockey History Digest" Eds. Red & White Books, Kingston, 2003
 4237 Dr. Adrian Preston & Peter Dennis (Edited) "Swords and Covenants: essays in honour of the centennial of the Royal Military College of Canada 1876‑1976" Rowman And Littlefield, London. Croom Helm. 1976. ’
 H16511 Dr. Richard Arthur Preston "Canada's RMC – A History of Royal Military College" Second Edition 1982
 H16511 Dr. Richard Preston "R.M.C. and Kingston: The effect of imperial and military influences on a Canadian community" 1968.
 H1877 R. Guy C. Smith (editor) "As You Were! Ex-Cadets Remember". In 2 Volumes. Volume I: 1876–1918. Volume II: 1919–1984. Royal Military College. [Kingston]. The R.M.C. Club of Canada. 1984.
 Alfred George Godfrey Würtele "Not In Cooke. – Account of a tour by the first graduating class of the Royal Military College", Kingston, 1880.
 Alfred George Godfrey Würtele "The non-professional notes of the cadets' tour of instruction to Montreal, Quebec, Halifax, and minor places: A work written for the information of the Canadian public, and forming an interesting supplement to the published official reports" Royal Military College of Canada, "Morning chronicle" Office, 1881
 Ernest F. Würtele Royal Military College Club of Canada. Reference book containing information respecting the graduates, ex-cadets and gentleman cadets of the Royal Military College of Canada: Privately printed, 1892. Reproduced in microform CIHM microfiche no. 14751.
 "To Serve Canada: A History of the Royal Military College since the Second World War", Ottawa, University of Ottawa Press, 1991.
 4669 Toivo Roht, (CMR RMC 1960) "Collège militaire royal de Saint-Jean, Royal Roads Military College and Royal Military College 1955–2006" 2007
 Yves Tremblay "" Outremont, Quebec Athena Editions, 2002.
 "RMC Cadet Handbook" Kingston, ON: RMC, 2004
 "Royal Military College of Canada: The Canadian Services Colleges" 1962
"The Royal Military College of Canada 1876 to 1919"
"A university with a difference: Royal Military College of Canada" Ottawa: Canada Department of National Defence, 1994.
"The Story of the Class of 1927 Since Graduation" (Kingston, Ontario Royal Military College of Canada 1952)
 The Stone Frigate, 1914 Royal Military College of Canada Publisher: Kingston, Whig

 Brochures
 Royal Military College of Canada, Fort Frederick: Facts brochure, (Kingston, 2000).
 Royal Military College of Canada, Visit Fort Frederick and the Royal Military College of Canada Museum brochure, (Kingston, 2000).

 Video
 The Royal Military College of Canada: A University with a difference video written and directed by Raymond Charette; produced by Carleton Productions Inc. for the Department of National Defence Canada. Dept. of National Defence: 1989. The video provides insight to life at the three military colleges – The Royal Military College of Canada, Royal Roads Military College and "le College militaire royal de Saint-Jean" NBD24988670
 A video representation of ROC '91 Royal Military College of Canada by RMC Video Productions was directed by Douglas Campbell and written by Bill Travis. This video provides insight as recruits are followed while they attend ROC'91 (recruit orientation camp of 1991) at the Royal Military College of Canada. The video includes dialogue in English and French. NBD24988090

Further reading 

 H16511 Dr. Richard Arthur Preston "To Serve Canada: A History of the Royal Military College of Canada" 1997 Toronto, University of Toronto Press, 1969.
 Dr. David C. Baird "Physics at RMC: the first 125 years 1876 to 2011" (Kingston, RMC, 2013)

External links

The Division of Continuing Studies at RMC
RMC's Alumni Website
RMC Club Kingston Alumni Website
RMC Virtual Museum
Unofficial Homepage of the RMC Paladins Varsity Hockey Program
Royal Military College of Canada-Institutional Virtual Campus
RMC Profile
Royal Military College of Canada, Massey Library search (catalogue-web)
Ontario Plaque Royal Military College of Canada
Archives of Ontario – Royal Military College of Canada
FLCKR – Royal Military College of Canada

 
Canadian Armed Forces
Educational institutions established in 1876
Military academies of Canada
Military education and training in Canada
French-language universities and colleges in Ontario
Universities in Ontario
Education in Kingston, Ontario
Military history of Canada
Organizations based in Canada with royal patronage
Military academies
Naval academies
Air force academies
Gothic Revival architecture in Kingston, Ontario
National Historic Sites in Ontario
Buildings and structures in Kingston, Ontario
1876 establishments in Ontario
Distance education institutions based in Canada